Pettah Power Station was a thermal power station in Colombo in south western Ceylon.

History
Pettah Power Station opened in 1898 and was located on Gasworks Street in the Pettah area of central Colombo. It was Ceylon's second power station after the one on Bristol Street in the Fort area. It was acquired by the Colombo Electric Tramways and Lighting Company (CETLC) after the company was formed in 1902. CETLC was bought by the government in 1928 and its operations transferred to the Department of Government Electrical Undertakings (DGEU). One more 3MW steam turbine was added in the 1930s. Three 1MW Diesel generator sets were added during World War II.

In 1956 the station's generating capacity stood at 9MW (one 3MW steam unit and three 2MW Mirlees diesel units). Six 2MW Mirlees diesel units were installed in 1957. In 1959 the station's generating capacity stood at 16MW (one 3MW steam unit, three 1MW diesel units and five 2MW diesel units).

By the early 1960s the station's generating capacity stood at 18MW (one 3MW steam unit, three 1MW diesel units and six 2MW diesel units) but its effective generating capacity stood at 14.5MW. 4MW of diesel units were transferred to Chunnakam Power Station. In 1969 the station's generating capacity stood at 16MW.

By the early 1980s the station's generating capacity stood at 6MW (three 2MW diesel units from the 1950s) and, although each unit was capable of 1.8MW output, they were only operating at 1.5MW each.

References

1898 establishments in Ceylon
Buildings and structures in Colombo
Former power stations in Sri Lanka
Oil-fired power stations in Sri Lanka